Mohammed Moulessehoul (born January 10, 1955), better known by the pen name Yasmina Khadra, is an Algerian author living in France, who writes in French. One of the most famous Algerian novelists in the world has written almost 40 novels, and has published in more than 50 countries. Khadra has often explored Algerian and other Arab countries' civil wars, depicting Muslim conflicts and reality, the attraction of radical Islamism to those alienated by the incompetence and hypocrisy of politicians, and conflicts between East and West. In his several writings on Algerian war, he has exposed the regime and the fundamentalist opposition as the joint guilty parties in the country's tragedy.

Biography

Early life, and short stories
Moulessehoul was born in 1955 in Kénadsa, in the Algerian Sahara. His mother, of nomadic origins, was her tribe's "chief storyteller". His father, initially a nurse, joined the Algerian National Liberation army, as Algeria began to fight for independence from France. He became an officer, wounded in 1958. Parents sent their three sons, Mohammed aged nine and later his two younger brothers, to the cadet school of Revolution in El Mechouar Palace, Tlemcen. Khadra describes the beginning of his passion for writing in his autobiography entitled The Writer, in this way he was able to keep privacy that he missed in the cadet dormitories. At first, he wanted to be a poet in Arabic language, but met professor of French origin.

While at military school, at age 18, he has finished his first volume of short stories, which was to appear eleven years later as Houria (1984).

Military career, first novels, and Algerian trilogy
At age 23, Khadra graduated from the Cherchell Military Academy (AMC), and joined the armed forces as a second lieutenant. He has published three collections of short stories and three novels under his real name between 1984 and 1989.

In the early nineties, as a commander in the special forces, he was stationed at the Algerian-Moroccan border and in Oran Province, during the military deployment against Islamic fundamentalists, AIS and GIA. He suffered three nervous breakdowns, escaped two ambushes and was three times forced to land in a helicopter.

In order to avoid a 1988 regulation, obliging soldiers to submit any written works to a military censorship board, Khadra published his further works under different pseudonyms, including 'Commissaire Llob'. Brahim Llob is also the name of the protagonist in a series of detective novels – the incorruptible, increasingly helpless police detective, who uncovers the grievances of Algerian society, including corruption and cliquism, and as a result gets between the frontlines of the Islamists and the powerful elite.

Following the publication of his first two books, Khadra could only get published abroad. To bypass the censorship, his wife signed his publishing contracts; in homage he later took as his pen name her first two names – Yasmina Khadra ("green jasmine blossom").

In 1997, Khadra published the detective novel Morituri (Eng. 2003), which was to bring him international recognition. Okacha Touita adapted and directed the film under the same title in 2004. Together with volumes Double Blank (1998, Eng. 2005) and Autumn of the Phantoms (1998, Eng. 2006), they form a trilogy, which portrays the Algerian Civil War and its background in a way that is both authentic and interesting. He has written these novels with a European (French) readership in mind as they focus on the psychological and social causes of Islamic fundamentalism using precise documentary detail and emotional intensity. He describes, from perspective of inspector Llob, Algerian everyday life and its omnipresent violence – bombings, corruption and the lack of economic prospects for large parts of the population. With these novels, he has succeeded in anchoring the genre detective novel in the Algerian literature. Together with his earlier books, Le Dingue au bistouri (1990) and La Foire des enfoirés (1993), they meet the formal criteria of the French roman noir subgenre. In the final volume, protagonist is discovered as the author behind the pseudonym Yasmina Khadra, is suspended from service, and dies.

Khadra himself managed to escape the same fate. In 2000, he quit the army to concentrate on literature and went with his family into exile in France via Mexico.

France, over 30 novels
Khadra settled in Aix-en-Provence. In 2001, he has published autobiography entitled The Writer (L'Écrivain), in which he wrote about his life as a soldier and as a writer, receiving 'Médaille de vermeil' award from the French Academy. That same year, he revealed his true identity. In respect for his wife, who had laid the economic basis for the new beginning in France through trips and negotiations with publishers, he decided to keep the pen name. His pseudonym posed initially a problem and rumors, from a public point of view it was a sensation:

One of French critics noted eventually however: "A he or a she? It doesn't matter. What matters is that Yasmina Khadra is today one of Algeria's most important writers." Although Khadra lives in France, he does not allow himself to be absorbed by the western point of view, but rather advocates getting to know and understanding.

His Algerian trilogy was followed in 2002 by The Swallows of Kabul (Eng. 2004), in which action takes place in 1998's Afghanistan. The novel depicts the dictatorship of the Talibans and the condition of the Afghan woman. In an interview with the German radio station SWR1 in 2006, Khadra said:

Adam Piore of Newsweek wrote: "Yet it is the journey into the beaten souls of Khandra's characters that makes this book so affecting. Few writers have so powerfully conveyed what it feels like to live in a totalitarian society, where uncompromising zealotry has thoroughly penetrated the national psyche. This book is a masterpiece of misery." The Swallows of Kabul was shortlisted for the IMPAC International Dublin Literary Award in 2006. The novel was adapted to animated film under the same title in 2019.

In 2004, Khadra published crime novel Dead Man's Share (Eng. 2009), in which his character Llob becomes the plaything of the mighty in post-colonial Algeria.

The Attack (2005, Eng. 2006) explores Israeli-Palestinian conflict, and follows the life of an Arab Israeli couple living in Tel Aviv. The protagonist is a well-established medical doctor whose life is turned upside down when his wife becomes Islamist terrorist and a suicide bomber. The novel received several literary prizes in 2006, including Prix des libraires – a prize chosen by about five thousand bookstores in France, Belgium, Switzerland, and Canada – as the first Algerian laureate. In 2008, The Attack was shortlisted for the IMPAC award, his second work nominated. The novel's film adaptation, The Attack (2012) by Ziad Doueiri, garnered positive critics' reviews. In The Sirens of Baghdad, published in 2006 (Eng. 2007), Khadra looks at Iraq War.

What the Day Owes the Night (2008, Eng. 2010) is a saga that takes place in Algeria between 1930 and 1962 and depicts a courageous defense of the double Franco-Algerian culture. "Broader in its canvas then his page-turning stories of Baghdad or Kabul [..] tale of family, love and war [...] Rich in incident and character (and ably translated by Frank Wynne), the novel shows us from within the colonised Algeria that Camus – as he acknowledged – could only glimpse as an outsider." Film adaptation under the same title (2012) did not meet commercial expectations, but was positively reviewed.

In 2011, Khadra has been awarded honorary Henri Gal Grand Prize for Literature by the French Academy.

Reviewing his novel Cousin K (2003, Eng. 2013), Steve Emmet of the New York Journal of Books wrote "Cousin K may be a small book but it is a giant of a literary work." In Khalil (2018, Eng. 2021), Khadra puts himself in the shoes of a Belgian terrorist of Moroccan origin, who blew himself up in Paris in November 2015. This novel was one of the best-selling books in France in 2018.

His novels have been translated into 48 languages, and published in 56 countries. Besides film adaptations, including international productions, they were also adapted to theater, and comics.

In 2007–2014, he served as director of the Algerian Cultural Center in Paris, at the request of President of Algeria Abdelaziz Bouteflika. Khadra was removed from this position, after he had described the fourth term of President as "absurdity".

2014 presidential campaign
On 2 November 2013, Khadra announced his candidacy for the presidency of Algeria. He was however unable to qualify, collecting only 43,000 of the 90,000 signatures required.

Publications

As Muhammad Moulessehoul
 1984: Amen! (Algeria)
 1984: Houria: stories (Algeria)
 1985: La fille du pont (The girl on the bridge, Algeria)
 1986: El-Kahira, cellule de la mort (El Kahira: cell of death)
 1988: De l'autre coté de la ville (The other side of the city)
 1989: Le privilège du phénix (The privilege of the phoenix, Algeria)

As Yasmina Khadra
 1990: Le Dingue au bistouri. Book 1 of Superintendent Llob Series
 1993: La Foire des enfoirés: les enquêtes du Commissaire Llob (The Idiots' Fair: the Investigations of Commissioner Llob). Book 2 of Superintendent Llob Series
 1997: Morituri, translated by David Herman (Toby Press, 2003). Book 3rd of Superintendent Llob Series, 1st of an Algerian trilogy
 1998: Double Blank (Double blanc), translated by Aubrey Botsford (Toby Press, 2005). Book 4 of Superintendent Llob Series, 2nd of an Algerian trilogy
 1998: Autumn of the Phantoms (L'Automne des Chimères), translated by Aubrey Botsford (Toby Press, 2006). Book 5 of Superintendent Llob Series, 3rd of an Algerian trilogy
 1998: In the Name of God (Les Agneaux du Seigneur), translated by Linda Black (2000)
 1999: Wolf Dreams (À quoi rêvent les loups), translated by Linda Black (2003).
 2001: The Writer (L'Écrivain)
 2002: The Imposture of Words (L'Imposture des mots)
 2002: The Swallows of Kabul (Les Hirondelles de Kaboul), translated by John Cullen (Nan A. Talese/Doubleday, 2004)
 2003: Cousin K, translated by Donald Nicholson-Smith, Alyson Waters
 2004: Dead Man's Share (La part du mort), translated by Aubrey Botsford (Toby Press, 2009). Book 6 of Superintendent Llob Series
 2005: The Attack (L'Attentat), translated by John Cullen (Nan A. Talese, 2006)
 2006: The Sirens of Baghdad (Les Sirènes de Bagdad), translated by John Cullen (Nan A. Talese, 2007)
 2008: What the Day Owes the Night (Ce que le jour doit à la nuit), translated by Frank Wynne (2010)
 2011: The African Equation (L'Équation africaine), translated by Howard Curtis (Gallic Books, 2015)
 2013: The Angels Die (Les anges meurent de nos blessures), translated by Howard Curtis (2016)
 2014: Qu'attendent les singes
 2015: The Dictator's Last Night (La dernière nuit du rais), translated by Julian Evans (Gallic Books, 2015)
 2016: Dieu n'habite pas La Havane
 2018: Khalil (Khalil), translated by John Cullen (Nan A. Talese, 2021)
 2022: Les Vertueux, aux éditions Mialet-Barrault

Filmography
 2014: Two Men in Town, by Rachid Bouchareb, co-screenwriter

Film adaptations
 2007: Morituri, by Okacha Touita
 2007: Dhokha, by Pooja Bhatt
 2012: What the Day Owes the Night, by Alexandre Arcady
 2012: The Attack, by Ziad Doueiri
 2019: The Swallows of Kabul, by Zabou Breitman

Awards and honors
2001: 'Médaille de vermeil', an award by Institut de France upon proposal of French Academy – The Writer
 2005: "Best Book of 2005" by the San Francisco Chronicle and The Christian Science Monitor
 2006: Prix des libraires, a prize chosen by about five thousand bookstores in France, Belgium, Switzerland, and Canada – The Attack (L'Attentat)
 2006: Prix Tropiques (AFD Literary Prize) – The Attack
 2011: Henri Gal Literature Grand Prize, an honorary award by Institut de France upon proposal of French Academy
 2018: Grand Prix of Literary Associations (Belles-Lettres category) – Khalil

See also
 Algerian literature
 List of Algerian writers
 African literature
 List of African writers by country

References

External links

 
 The Swallows of Kabul review: Mohammed Moulessehoul, the real 'Yasmina Khadra – The Guardian
 What the Day Owes the Night review: Love and Nostalgia in Times of War – Qantara.de

Algerian novelists
Exophonic writers
1955 births
Living people
People from Kénadsa
Algerian military personnel
Algerian writers in French
20th-century novelists
21st-century novelists
Prix des libraires winners
20th-century pseudonymous writers
21st-century pseudonymous writers
21st-century Algerian people